China National Highway 305 (G305) runs northwest from Zhuanghe, Liaoning towards Linxi, Inner Mongolia. It is 815 kilometres in length.

Route and distance

See also 

 China National Highways

Transport in Liaoning
Transport in Inner Mongolia
305